Elizabeth Macarthur (14 August 1766 – 9 February 1850) was an Anglo-Australian pastoralist and merchant, and wife of John Macarthur.

Early life
Elizabeth Macarthur was born in Bridgerule, Devon, England, the daughter of provincial farmers, Richard and Grace Veale of Cornish origin. Her father died when she was aged four years. Her mother remarried when she was 11, leaving Elizabeth in the care of her grandfather, John, and friends. 

Elizabeth married Plymouth soldier John Macarthur in 1788. In 1790, with her newborn son Edward, she accompanied John and his regiment, the New South Wales Corps, to the recently established colony of New South Wales, travelling on the Second Fleet.

Life in New South Wales
Elizabeth was the first soldier's wife to arrive in New South Wales. Being educated, articulate, and well-read, her letters provide an important record of the infant convict town of Sydney and colonial life. She was an amateur astronomer and botanist and enjoyed a privileged position in society where she "held court amongst officers of the New South Wales Corps, naval officers and members of the colonial administration". 

John was made Commandant at Parramatta and received land grants in 1793 near there, at Rosehill, naming his property Elizabeth Farm after his wife. John became paymaster to the New South Wales Corps and director of public works. Elizabeth's respectability and charm were in contrast to her husband's disputatious nature and meant that she and her children retained a good social standing despite John's many controversial actions in the following years. However, Governor Phillip was the only governor she associated with, as her husband's business activities and actions later were "too controversial for any governor to seek the company of the Macarthur family".  She had to travel to London leaving her family behind.

Elizabeth's work centered on her family, the education of her children, and the management of a modest household. Elizabeth died in 1850, having first been estranged from her husband as his melancholia and paranoia deepened, and then surviving him by 16 years. She was an Anglican.

Role in founding Australian wool industry 

Between 1801 and 1805, John was living in England, where he had been sent for court-martial after wounding his superior officer in a duel, and again from 1808 to 1817, avoiding an arrest warrant for his role in the Rum Rebellion of January 1808, and then because he refused to accept the terms for his return to New South Wales which were that he admits his wrongdoing and promise to be of good behavior. During these periods, Elizabeth oversaw the family estates at Parramatta, Camden, Seven Hills, and Pennant Hills. This included the management of household and business accounts, the employment of convict labor, the supervision of wool washing, baling, and transport, and the selection of rams and breeding to improve the flock. While John expressed his gratitude and admiration for her ability to cope, her irregular and inadequate correspondence were of constant concern. Nonetheless, her contribution was essential to the success of the enterprise and establishing New South Wales as a reliable supplier of quality wool. In England, John used his flair to promote the Australian wool industry while Elizabeth used her organizational ability and application to produce the wool.

During her husband's insanity and after his death in 1834, she continued to run the enterprises with great success until her death in 1850.

Family

From nine pregnancies, seven children survived childhood. Her sons, Edward (1789–1872), James (1793-1794), John (1794-1831), James (1798-1867) and William (1800-1882), made worthy contributions to colonial governance, agriculture, politics and trade. Her eldest daughter Elizabeth (1792-1842) remained unmarried, despite at least two 'offers' declined by her parents. Her younger daughters Mary (Mrs Bowman, b.1795) and Emmeline (b.1808) married into colonial families.
Sir Edward Macarthur (1789–1872) married Sarah (née Neil) in 1862, and they died childless.
James Macarthur (1798–1867) married Emily (née Stone). They had only one child, daughter Elizabeth (1840-1911).
 Sir William Macarthur (1800–1882) never married. 

The bulk of the Macarthur estate, through the brothers William, James and Edward, passed to James' only child, daughter Elizabeth (1840-1911), who in 1867 married Arthur Onslow (1833–1882). In 1892, after Arthur's death, Elizabeth changed the family name to Macarthur-Onslow.  She and Arthur had six children, including James Macarthur-Onslow (1867–1946), George Macarthur-Onslow (1875–1931) and Arthur Macarthur-Onslow (1879–1938).

Legacy
The Elizabeth Macarthur Agricultural Institute is named in her honour.  It is the largest Centre of Excellence operated by New South Wales Department of Primary Industries, employing 200 scientists and located at Camden Park.

Elizabeth Macarthur is commemorated on the 1995 Australian five-dollar coin which was struck for inclusion in a special Masterpieces in Silver collector proof set entitled Colonial Australia.

One of Elizabeth's accounting books refers to a Machiping having made a linen press and other sundry items. He was paid £8 pounds in 1824. The desk is believed to survive in Milton House museum, in Milton NSW. Mak Sai Ying is believed to be the first Chinese man to live in Australia.

Elizabeth Macarthur is the subject of a fictitious memoir, A Room Made of Leaves, by Australian author, Kate Grenville, published in 2020.

References

Further reading
 
 
 

Settlers of Australia
1766 births
1850 deaths
People from New South Wales
Australian people of Cornish descent
Australian diarists
19th-century Australian writers
Women diarists
19th-century Australian businesspeople
19th-century Australian women writers
Macarthur family (Australia)